The Fédération Tunisienne de Tennis (FTT), is the national Tennis association in Tunisia. FTT organizes team tennis within Tunisia and represents Tunisian tennis internationally. The federation is a member of the International Tennis Federation (ITF), Confederation of African Tennis (CAT) and the Arab Tennis Federation (ATF). The president of FTT is Salma Mouelhi.

Board Members
The new federal office of the FTT mandate 2016-2020 composed by:

See also
Tunisia Davis Cup team
Tunisia Fed Cup team
Tunis Open
Nana Trophy

References

External links
Site officiel de la FTT 

National members of the Confederation of African Tennis
Tennis in Tunisia
Tennis
Sports organizations established in 1920